Movements is the second studio album by German electronic music duo Booka Shade, released on 16 May 2006 on Get Physical Music.

Critical reception

Pitchfork placed Movements at number 50 on its list of the top 50 albums of 2006.

Track listing

References

2006 albums
Booka Shade albums